Karaçoban is a town and district of Erzurum Province in the Eastern Anatolia region of Turkey. The population was 8,837 in 2010.

Neighbourhoods

 Akkavak
 Binpınar
 Bozyer
 Budaklı
 Burnaz
 Dedeören
 Doğanbey
 Duman
 Erenler
 Gündüzköy
 Karagöz
 Karaköprü
 Karmış
 Kuşluca
 Kırımkaya
 Marufköy
 Molladavut
 Ovayoncalı
 Çatalgül

References

Populated places in Erzurum Province
Districts of Erzurum Province
Towns in Turkey
Kurdish settlements in Turkey